Värtsilä or Wärtsilä may refer to:

 Värtsilä, Finland, a former municipality
 Vyartsilya, an urban locality in Russia, formerly part of the Finnish municipality
 Wärtsilä, a neighbourhood in Järvenpää
 Wärtsilä or Wärtsilä Oyj Abp (Wärtsilä Corporation), a Finnish company in the marine and energy markets